Lincoln is a historic unincorporated village in the Loudoun Valley of Loudoun County, Virginia, located approximately  south of Purcellville. It was established as the community of Goose Creek during the 1750s by Quaker settlers and renamed "Lincoln" for the president of the same name, shortly after his election in 1860.

Lining the main road through the village are several stately homes, the Goose Creek Friends Meeting House, the Glebe of Shelburne Parish, and a historic Quaker cemetery. The village is surrounded by and included in the Goose Creek Historic District.

Climate
The climate in this area is characterized by hot, humid summers and generally mild to cool winters.  According to the Köppen Climate Classification system, Lincoln has a humid subtropical climate, abbreviated "Cfa" on climate maps.

References

Unincorporated communities in Loudoun County, Virginia
Washington metropolitan area
Unincorporated communities in Virginia